Pradeep Kondiparthi is an Indian actor known for his works in Telugu cinema, theatre, and television. He is widely known for portraying Character actor roles in a variety of genres. Pradeep has starred in over eighty serials, and twenty feature films.  In Television he is known for his works in Doordarshan, and conducts personality and corporate development seminars.

Selected filmography
As actor
2022 F3
2019 F2: Fun and Frustration
2008 Premabhishekam
2006 Gopi – Goda Meeda Pilli
1983 Rendu Jella Sita
1982 Nalugu Stambalata
1981 Mudda Mandaram

Television
Soap operas
Anaganaga Sobhu
Matti Manushulu
Pelli Pandhiri
Chaanakya
Saadhana
Butchi Babu
Anando Brahma
Mamathala Kovela as Sarvarayudu

References

Indian male television actors
Indian male soap opera actors
Living people
Telugu people
Telugu male actors
Male actors in Telugu cinema
Indian male film actors
Male actors from Andhra Pradesh
Nandi Award winners
20th-century Indian male actors
21st-century Indian male actors
Year of birth missing (living people)